Mabel Simpson is a Ghanaian fashion designer and CEO of mSimps in Ghana.

Early life 
Mabel was born to Mr and Mrs Simpson in  Accra, Greater Accra Region of Ghana.

Education 
Simpson's primary education took place at Ridge Church School and her secondary education was at Wesley Girls’ High School, where she studied Visual Arts.

Mabel  studied at the Kwame Nkrumah University of Science and Technology where she studied Communication Design and Visual Arts graduating with a Second Class Upper in BA Communication Design.

Career 
She started mSimps with a borrowed sowing machine from her grandmother. At age 25, with a capital of US$100 (GHS200), Simpson resigned from her office job in August 2010 to start mSimps. It took mSimps five years to go international, mSimps now has suppliers in the US, Australia, Canada  Nigeria and South Africa.

Personal life 
She is single and fellowships at St. Augustine Anglican Church in Dansoman.

Awards 
 She has been recognised internationally regarding young entrepreneurship skills by CNN and BBC.
 Mabel was the 10th finalist in the Joy Fm My Business 2011
 She was also the 2ndrunner up in the 2012 Enablis / UT BANK Business LaunchPad competition
 She won the Accessory Brand of the Year 2013 at the Glitz Africa Fashion Week
 Mabel won Best Handbag and Purse Product of the Year 2013 at 1st Ghana Made Products Awards

References 

Living people
Ghanaian fashion designers
Ghanaian women fashion designers
1984 births
Ridge Church School alumni